Mithila Bambai Aam (Mithila's Bombay Mango) is a mango variation recognized by its unique sweetness and memorable smell compared to other types of mangoes cultivated in the Mithila region of Bihar and Nepal. It contains plenty of both pulp and juice.  It is more fruitful in Mithila. The ideal season to produce Mithila Bambai Aam is early summer, as it is regularly at its ripest in June, notwithstanding infrequencies.

Description 
On ripening of the mango, the area near the stalk becomes slightly yellow and the rest of the part remains green. So this mango is also known as Bambai Hara for its green colour. The fruit is medium in size having weight 150 grams to 200 grams, the pulp is solid without fiber with medium sweetness and intense aroma.

Types 
There are mainly three varieties of the mango. They are Doma Bambai, Nejra Bambai and Sabja Bambai. There are three more varieties  Mandhanzhak Bambai, Ujri Bambai or Kharadakh and Sauda Bambai.

References 

Mangoes
Mithila